Mound Hill (also known as the "Nelson Gay Mound") is an archaeological site in the Bluegrass region of the U.S. state of Kentucky. Located north of Winchester in far northern Clark County, the site is part of a group of Indian mounds lining Stoner Creek, although by far the largest of the group. The surveyors suggested that its linear shape with a central depression might have been the result of erosion or of the construction of multiple mounds that were later merged into one. Digging at these mounds, which were seemingly related to Mound Hill, produced artifacts such as pottery and a pipe, as well as numerous stone box graves.

In 1978, Mound Hill was listed on the National Register of Historic Places. It is believed to have been built by peoples of the Adena culture.

References

Adena culture
Archaeological sites on the National Register of Historic Places in Kentucky
National Register of Historic Places in Clark County, Kentucky
Mounds in Kentucky